List of Ottoman scientists.

Before the 16th century 

 Kadi zada al Rumi (1364-1429), mathematician and astronomer
 Sabuncuoğlu Şerafeddin (1385-1468), physician
 Akşemseddin (1389-1459), physician and philosopher
 Ali Kuşçu (1403-1474), mathematician, astronomer, physicist, philosopher, theologian
 Mirim Çelebi (1450-1525), mathematician and astronomer
 Ahi Mehmet Çelebi (1450-1500), physician

16th century 

 Muhammed Konevi (1450-1524), astronomer 
 Matrakçi Nasuh (1480-1564), mathematician 
 Mimar Sinan (1488-1588), architect, Süleymaniye Mosque, Haseki Complex, Haseki Mosque, Selimiye Mosque, Eski Valide Mosque, Mihrimah Sultan Complex, Mihrimah Sultan Mosque, Şehzade Mosque, Cihangir Mosque, Şah Sultan Mosque, Rüstem Paşa Mosque, Sokollu Mehmet Paşa Complex, Sokollu Mehmet Paşa Bridge, Kılıç Ali Paşa Mosque, Gazi Ahmet Paşa Mosque architect, Art genius 
 Mustafa Muvakkit (1498-1571), astronomer
 Piri Reis (1465-1554), geographer 
 Seydi Ali Reis (1498-1564), mathematician and admiral
 Taki-aldin (1521-1585), mathematician, astronomer, physicist, optics, mechanics, watchmaker
 Emir Çelebi (1560-1600), physician and historian

Ottoman Empire-related lists
Science and technology in the Ottoman Empire
Scientists from the Ottoman Empire